Giuseppe Nicolini (or Niccolini; 29 January 1762 – 18 December 1842) was an Italian composer who wrote at least 45 operas. From 1819 onwards, he devoted himself primarily to religious music.  He was born and died at Piacenza.

Operas
Nicolini's operas include:
La famiglia stravagante (dramma giocoso, 1793, Parma)
La clemenza di Tito (opera seria, libretto by Pietro Metastasio, 1797, Livorno)
I due fratelli ridicoli (Li fratelli ridicoli) (dramma giocoso, libretto by Filippo Livigni, 1798, Rome)
Il trionfo del bel sesso (dramma giocoso, libretto by Giovanni Bertati, 1799)
I baccanali di Roma (1801, Milan)
Il geloso innamorato (farsa, libretto by Giambattista Lorenzi, 1804, Naples)
 (opera seria, libretto by Michelangelo Prunetti, 1807, Rome)
Le due gemelle (farsa, 1808, Rome)
Coriolano ossia L'assedio di Roma (opera seria, libretto by Luigi Romanelli, 1808, Milan)
Angelica e Medoro ossia L'Orlando (opera seria, libretto by Gaetano Sertor from Pietro Metastasio, 1810, Turin)
Abradate e Dircea (opera seria, libretto by Luigi Romanelli, 1811, Milan)
Quinto Fabio (Quinto Fabio Rutililiano) (opera seria, libretto by Giuseppe Rossi, 1811, Vienna)
La casa dell'astrologo (dramma giocoso, libretto by Luigi Romanelli, 1811, Milan)
Le nozze dei Morlacchi (I Morlacchi) (opera seria, 1811, Vienna)
La feudataria ossia Il podestà ridicolo (dramma giocoso, 1812, Piacenza)
Carlo Magno (opera seria, libretto by Antonio Peracchi, 1813, Piacenza)
L'eroe di Lancastro (opera seria, libretto by Giuseppe Rossi, 1821, Turin)
Aspasia e Agide (opera seria, libretto by Luigi Romanelli, 1824, Milan)

Bibliography
"Niccolini (Joseph)", in François-Joseph Fétis, Biographie universelle des musiciens et bibliographie générale de la musique, vol. 6, Paris, Firmin-Didot, 1866–1868, pp. 310–311
Andrea Lanza: "Nicolini, Giuseppe", The New Grove Dictionary of Music and Musicians, 2001
G. Nicolini: "Gratias agimus Tibi", dal "Gloria" della Missa Brevis in Re for 3 voices and orchestra, edition by Mario G. Genesi, Piacenza, P. M. Edizione, 2008, pp. 10.
Mario Genesi, "La cantata italiana mitologico-occasionale da palazzo e l'oratorio biblico per soli, coro ed orchestra (1800–1830) nelle frequentazioni di due compositori piacentini: l'operista Giuseppe Nicolini e il conte Daniele Nicelli" in Archivio Storico per le Province Parmensi, Parma, Tip. Riunite Donati, vol. 64, 2013, pp. 323–383.
Mario Genesi, "Nicolini Vs.Mozart: La Cantata Il Sogno di Scipione su versi dell' abate Pietro Trapassi detto Metastasio"in Archivio Storico per le Province Parmensi, Parma, Tip. Riunite Donati
G. Nicolini, Violin concert in D major, modern edition by Luca Brignole, premiere: Piacenza, 21 December 2014

References
Notes

Sources
The Concise Grove Dictionary of Music, "Giuseppe Nicolini", Oxford University Press, Inc., 1994. Accessed online from Answers.com, 13 October 2009.
The list of operas is translated from Giuseppe Nicolini on the Italian Wikipedia.

Italian classical composers
Italian male classical composers
1762 births
1842 deaths
People from Piacenza
Italian opera composers
Male opera composers